Ectatomminae is a subfamily of ants in the poneromorph subfamilies group containing four extant and three extinct genera in two tribes. The subfamily was created in 2003 when Barry Bolton divided the Ponerinae subfamily into six subfamilies.

Genera
Ectatomminae Emery, 1895
Ectatommini Emery, 1895
 †Canapone Dlussky, 1999
 Ectatomma Smith, 1858
 †Electroponera Wheeler, 1915
 Gnamptogenys Roger, 1863
 †Pseudectatomma Dlussky & Wedman, 2012
 Rhytidoponera Mayr, 1862
Typhlomyrmecini Emery, 1911
 Typhlomyrmex Mayr, 1862

References

External links

 
Ant subfamilies
Taxa named by Carlo Emery